Normanby busway station is located in Brisbane, Australia serving the suburb of Kelvin Grove. It opened on 14 December 2005 on an existing section of the Inner Northern Busway. It is adjacent to Brisbane Grammar School and the Inner City Bypass.

It is served by eight routes all operated by Brisbane Transport.

References

External links
[ Normanby station] TransLink

Bus stations in Brisbane
Kelvin Grove, Queensland
Transport infrastructure completed in 2005